Abbey-Anne Gyles-Brown (born March 12, 1997) is an English model and beauty pageant titleholder who was crowned as Miss Earth England 2018. She represented England at Miss Earth 2018 Abbey-Anne was awarded the Ms Junca Beauty 2018 sponsor award.

Life and career 
Abbey-Anne Gyles studied performing arts at Northampton College and worked as match day hostess at Leicester City Football Club

Abbey-Anne works as an International model. She has modelled all over the UK, Europe, South Pacific & Asia.

. Abbey-Anne passed all of her British Theatre Dance Association exams with platinum and distinction.

Abbey-Anne is the Lead Youth Activist For Clean Up Britain organisation, which organises school tours to teach children about litter, television guesting and radio interviews, by posting on social media, and attending/organising events or by organising events. She also launched the first inland 2 Minute Litter pick boards in leamington spa for the Now Or Never Campaign which is a new project she is working on with Clean Up Britain.

Pageantry

Achievements 
 Miss Teen Great Britain 2012 Semifinalist
 Teen World Supermodel England 2013
 Beauty Queen Of The Year Personality Award Winner 2013
 Beauty Queen Of The Year Best Smile Award Winner 2013 
 Miss Northampton 2014
 Miss Teen Earth United Kingdom 2014
 Miss Teen Earth Northamptonshire 2014
Miss Earth Northamptonshire 2014-2018
 Miss Earth Fire 2016(England) 
Face of the World England 2017
Face Of The World International 1st Runner Up
 
 Miss Earth England 2018
 Beauties For A Cause Eco Ambassador 2018
 Ms Junca Beauty 2018
 Hair And Beauty Award Winner Miss Earth UK 2018
 Photogenic Award Winner Miss Earth UK 2018

Miss Earth 2018 
Gyles represented England in Miss Earth 2018 pageant in the Philippines. At her national competition held August 25 in Birmingham, she was also awarded Beauties for a Cause Eco Ambassador Award for her ongoing ecological work in the lead up to the national competition along with the Hair and Beauty award. Abbey-Anne has been a dedicated and ongoing Eco Warrior to the Miss Earth Pageant since 2014 after being crowned Miss Teen Earth UK.

On November 8, 2018, Gyles, along with Jaime VandenBerg of Canada and Emma Sheedy of Guam accused one of the Filipino sponsors of sexual harassment during a dinner at the Manila Yacht Club, claiming that he asked them for sexual favors in exchange for the crown or an advancement in the pageant. Sheedy had identified the sponsor as Amado S. Cruz.

References

External links 

1998 births
Living people
English beauty pageant winners
People from Northampton
Miss Earth 2018 contestants